Halse Hall is a plantation great house in Clarendon, Jamaica.

During the Spanish occupation of Jamaica the estate was known as "Hato de Buena Vista". In 1655, following the English capture of Jamaica the site was given to Major Thomas Halse who came from Barbados with Penn and Venables. Here he raised hogs, grazed cattle and built Halse Hall. The house had thick walls and served as the centre of the estate and a rallying point for defence. At the time of Thomas Halse death in 1702, the Great House was just a single-storey building. By the late 1740s the building was owned by his son, Francis Saddler Halse, who developed the property into a more imposing and beautiful two-storey structure. A new entrance was erected, accessed by an elaborate arrangement of stone steps flanked by columns and capped with a fanlight. A peaked portico was added later.

The Halse Hall Burial-Ground contains a tomb of the Halse family— Major Thomas Halse (d. 1702) and Thomas Halse (d. 1727).

The property belonged to Henry De la Beche who stayed there during 1823–24, while he made his geological survey of Jamaica. His Notes on the present condition of the negroes in Jamaica was based on his experiences on the estate. In December 1835 the estate was owned by the Hibbert family who received £3,523 11s 9d compensation when the 172 enslaved Africans were emancipated.  

In 1969 it was purchased by Alcoa Minerals of Jamaica who added another wing. Halse Hall is the oldest English building in Jamaica which is still used as a residence.

References

External links
List of Plantation Great Houses in Jamaica

Great Houses in Jamaica
Buildings and structures in Clarendon Parish, Jamaica
Plantations in Jamaica